The 2018 Reno mayoral election was held on November 6, 2018 to elect the mayor of Reno, Nevada. It saw the reelection of Hillary Schieve.

Results

Primary 
The primary was held June 12.

General election

References 

Reno mayoral
Mayoral elections in Reno, Nevada
Reno